T49 may refer to:

Aircraft
 Boeing CT-49, an American trainer
 Slingsby T.49 Capstan, a British glider
 Sukhoi T-49, a prototype Soviet fighter
 Wright T49, a turboprop engine

Vehicles 
 Hispano-Suiza T49, a Spanish automobile
 90mm Gun Tank T49, a variant of the M41 Walker Bulldog light tank